Vasily Filippov (born 16 January 1981) is a Russian handball player. He was born in Moscow. He competed at the 2008 Summer Olympics in Beijing, where the Russian team placed sixth.

References

External links

1981 births
Living people
Sportspeople from Moscow
Russian male handball players
Olympic handball players of Russia
Handball players at the 2008 Summer Olympics